The United Nations Operations in Mozambique (ONUMOZ) was a UN peace mission to Mozambique established in December 1992 under Security Council Resolution 797 with the assignment to monitor the implementation of the Rome General Peace Accords agreed upon by the Mozambican president Joaquim Chissano (FRELIMO) and Afonso Dhlakama of RENAMO. Its mandate ended in December 1994.

Mandate and Strength

ONUMOZ' mandate was:

To monitor and verify the ceasefire, the separation and concentration of forces, their demobilization and the collection, storage and destruction of weapons;
To monitor and verify the complete withdrawal of foreign forces and to provide security in the transport corridors;
To monitor and verify the disbanding of private and irregular armed groups;
To authorize security arrangements for vital infrastructures and to provide security for United Nations and other international activities in support of the peace process;
To provide technical assistance and monitor the entire electoral process;
To coordinate and monitor humanitarian assistance operations, in particular those relating to refugees, internally displaced persons, demobilized military personnel and the affected local population.

In order to accomplish its mission ONUMOZ had an authorised strength of 6.625 troops and military support personnel, 354 military observers, 1.144 civil police officers, 355 international staff, 506 local staff and 900 election observers.

Performance

The bulk of ONUMOZ troops under the command of Secretary-General's Special Representative Aldo Ajello was deployed in early 1993. Initially, ONUMOZ faced significant resistance carrying out its mission. Due to distrust among the conflict parties, the collection of weapons could only begin as late in November 1993 following a visit of the UN Secretary General and a further resolution of the UN Security Council (United Nations Security Council Resolution 882). Thus the original schedule which had aimed for elections in October 1993 could not be met. Despite of these obstacles the mission was a success with the holding of general, free elections on 13 October 1994. ONUMOZ's mandate expired with the swearing in of president Joaquim Chissano and the newly elected parliament and the mission was liquidated in January 1995. Prior to this, ONUMOZ had disarmed some 76,000 fighters, collected 155,000 firearms, helped train 10,000 soldiers of the new Mozambican Armed Forces (FADM) and helped repatriating most of the five million refugees and internally displaced people uprooted by the civil war. In doing so it had suffered 26 casualties. The mission cost US $492.6 million  and an additional $616 million was spent on humanitarian aid.

References

Source cited
United Nations: ONUMOZ Mission

Mozambique
History of Mozambique
Military history of Mozambique
782
1992 in Mozambique
Mozambique and the United Nations